UJ may refer to:

Universities:
University of Jaffna, in Sri Lanka
Jagiellonian University of Kraków, Poland
University of Jamestown, in Jamestown, North Dakota, US
University of Johannesburg, South Africa
University of Jordan, the oldest institution of higher learning in Jordan
University of Judaism, former name of the American Jewish University

Other uses:
Awj, a Syrian village near Hama, sometimes spelled Uj
Microjoule (μJ), a unit of energy equal to one millionth of one joule
 , a Hungarian-language Zionist Jewish Newspaper
UJ Seuteni, a rugby union footballer
Union Jack or Union Flag, the national flag of the United Kingdom
Universal joint, a mechanical coupling